Poiana Ilvei is a commune in Bistrița-Năsăud County, Transylvania, Romania. It is composed of a single village, Poiana Ilvei, part of Măgura Ilvei Commune until 2003, when it was split off.

References

Communes in Bistrița-Năsăud County
Localities in Transylvania